Anarithma is a small genus of sea snails, marine gastropod mollusks in the family Mitromorphidae, in the superfamily Conoidea the cone snails and their allies.

Species
 Anarithma drivasi Chang, 1995
 Anarithma maesi Drivas & Jay, 1986
 Anarithma metula (Hinds, 1843)
 Anarithma stepheni (Melvill & Standen, 1897)
 Anarithma sublachryma (Hervier, 1900)
Species brought into synonymy
 Anarithma alphonsiana (Hervier, 1900): synonym of Mitromorpha alphonsiana (Hervier, 1900)
 Anarithma dibolos K.H. Barnard, 1964: synonym of Anarithma metula (Hinds, 1843)
 Anarithma dorcas Kuroda, Habe & Oyama, 1971: synonym of Mitromorpha dorcas (Kuroda, Habe & Oyama, 1971)
 Anarithma garrettii W.H. Pease, 1860: synonym of Anarithma metula (Hinds, 1843)
 Anarithma iki E.A. Kay, 1979: synonym of Anarithma metula (Hinds, 1843)
 Anarithma lachryma L.A. Reeve, 1845: synonym of Anarithma metula (Hinds, 1843)
 Anarithma pacei Melvill, J.C. & R. Standen, 1897 (renamed): synonym of Anarithma stepheni (Melvill & Standen, 1897)
 Anarithma pamila P.L. Duclos in J.C. Chenu, 1848: synonym of Anarithma metula (Hinds, 1843)
 Anarithma pusiola R.W. Dunker, 1871: synonym of Anarithma metula (Hinds, 1843)
 Anarithma salisburyi (Cernohorsky, 1978): synonym of Mitromorpha salisburyi (Cernohorsky, 1978)
 Anarithma sublachryma R.P.J. Hervier, 1900: synonym of Anarithma metula (Hinds, 1843)

References

  Tom iredale, On some new and old molluscan generic names;. Proc. Malac. Soc. Lond. 12: 140-201, pls. 8-10 
  Bouchet P., Kantor Yu.I., Sysoev A. & Puillandre N. (2011) A new operational classification of the Conoidea. Journal of Molluscan Studies 77: 273-308

External links
 
 Worldwide Mollusc Species Data Base: Mitromorphidae

 
Gastropod genera
Mitromorphidae